Kabala is a village in Rapla Parish, Rapla County in northwestern Estonia.

Kabala Manor is located in Kabala village.

Gallery

References

 

Villages in Rapla County